

Legend

List

References

2000-01